Sri Lanka Railways Class M8 is a class of Sri Lankan diesel-electric locomotive that was developed by Banaras Locomotive Works at Varanasi, India, in 1996. This class of locomotives was fitted with  V16 power units. This is used on both passenger and freight trains on Sri Lanka Railways. Currently this is the most powerful locomotive in Sri Lanka.

Performance
This locomotive is capable of hauling 20 carriages at once but usually not used to haul more than 18 carriages. Major problems that are seen in this class are maintenance difficulties and corrosion.

Sub classes

M8A

Two (877 & 878) short truck M8A locomotives were delivered in 2001. They were imported to use on Up country main line, but it was impossible to run them due to their wheel design of HAHS bogie without equaliser beams. M8A locomotives were built using  V12 power units.

Current operation
M8 and M8A are not used on the Main Line above Nawalapitiya and on the Kelani Valley Line but are operated on other lines. This locomotive is used when it need to pull much heavy load. Mainly used in flat lines like Northern Line, Trincomalee Line, Batticaloa Line and Coastal Line.

Depot for the M8s is Diesel Electric Locomotive Shed at Maradana.

Accidents and incidents
 M8A No. 878 was seriously damaged in an accident with a concrete mixing transport truck. Since the accident, the locomotive has been repaired and put back into service.

See also
Sri Lanka Railways

Notes and references

External links
 Article about Class M8 locomotive

M08
Co-Co locomotives
ALCO locomotives
Railway locomotives introduced in 1962
5 ft 6 in gauge locomotives